The 14th Miss Chinese International Pageant, Miss Chinese International 2002 was held in Guangzhou, China. This marked the second time the pageant was held outside Hong Kong. China would not host the pageant again, until 2007. For the first time in history, Vancouver won the title again, for the second consecutive year.

Pageant information
The theme to this year's pageant is "Gathering the Focus of the World, Witnessing the Most Beautiful Chinese" 「世界焦點凝聚  見證最美華裔」.  The Masters of Ceremonies include Priscilla Ku, Melissa Ng, and Gordon Lam.  This year marks the first year the pageant is held outdoors, at the outdoors performance theatre located in the Changlong Night Zoo inside Chime-Long Paradise.

Results

Special awards
Miss Friendship: Marjorie Wu 胡凱欣 (Honolulu)
Miss Svelte Beauty: Christie Bartram 白穎茵 (Toronto)
Miss Modern China: Shirley Yeung 楊思琦 (Hong Kong)
Miss Beauty and the Beast: Shirley Zhou 周雪 (Vancouver)

Contestant list

Crossovers
Contestants who previously competed or will be competing at other international beauty pageants:

Miss World
 2004: : Lisa Huang

Miss Universe
 2003: Melbourne, : Beverly Chen (''representing )

Contestant notes
Beverly Chen went on to compete in Miss Universe 2003 in Panama. She was involved in a scandal over her sash, as she was requested to wear a sash named "Chinese Taipei", rather than "Taiwan."
Lisa Huang went on to Sanya, China, to compete in Miss World 2004.

External links
 Miss Chinese International Pageant 2002 Official Site

TVB
2002 beauty pageants
2002 in China
Beauty pageants in China
Miss Chinese International Pageants